Johnny Yin (born ) is a Taiwanese singer and host. Born in Taipei, Taiwan, Yin has won three Golden Melody Awards for Best Male Mandarin Singer. He has also won the Golden Tripod and two Golden Bell Awards, earning him the name "Three Gold Singer". Yin is known for his thick and loud singing voice.

Life and career 
Yin was born on 23 January 1961. His ancestral home is Hanyang County, Hubei (now Hanyang District, Wuhan).

In 1986, he published his first album, "Misty Regrets" (雨中的歉意). In 1990, he won the 1st Golden Melody Award for Best Male Singer. Yin would later win the 5th and 6th Golden Melody Awards, holding a record for most times a male singer has won the award until Eason Chan tied it in 2018.

Personal life 
Yin is currently a co-host with his wife, Li Wenyuan, for Da AI TV programs "Yin-Yuan and Friends" (殷瑗小聚) and "Music has Love" (音樂有愛).

Discography

Awards and nominations

References

External links 

1961 births
Living people
20th-century Taiwanese male singers
21st-century Taiwanese male singers
Taiwanese Mandopop singers
National Central University alumni